Pathatrix  is a high volume recirculating immuno magnetic-capture system for the detection of pathogens in food and environmental samples.  Pathatrix was used in 2006, linking an E. coli O157:H7 outbreak to contaminated spinach.

The Pathatrix system is being used by regulatory agencies and food companies around the world to enhance their pathogen detection capabilities.

Unlike other detection methods, Pathatrix allows the entire pre-enriched sample or large pooled samples to be recirculated over antibody-coated paramagnetic beads. It can specifically isolate pathogens directly from food samples and in conjunction with quantitative PCR can provide results within hours. It is also used to improve the performance of other rapid methods such as PCR, lateral flow, ELISA and chromogenic media by reducing or eliminating the need for lengthy pre enrichment and/or selective enrichment steps. The Pathatrix is useful in pathogen labs that would be running food samples and looking for foodborne diseases.

The Pathatrix is a rapid test method and Pathatrix pooling allows the screening of large numbers of food samples in a highly cost-effective way for specific pathogens such as E. coli O157, Salmonella or Listeria monocytogenes.

The Pathatrix will selectively bind and purify the target organism from a comprehensive range of complex food matrices (including raw ground beef, chocolate, peanut butter, leafy greens, spinach, tomatoes). The Pathatrix is the only microbial detection system that allows for the entire sample to be analyzed.

See also 
 Thermo Fisher Scientific

References 
 Wu, Vivian (February 2004), "Rapid Protocol(5.25H) For The Detection Of Escherichia coli In Raw Ground Beef By An Immuno-Capture System (Pathatrix) In Combination With Colortrix and CT-SMAC", Journal of Rapid Methods and Automation in Microbiology, 2, (2004)57-67
A.Y Asahina, R. Fujioka, A. Henry, P.C. Loh (2007) Using Indigenous Mollusks and Pathatrix to Detect Pathogens in Water. Dept. of Microbiology, University of Hawaii-Manoa, USA (34th Annual International Global Health Conference, Washington, D.C., USA, May 29 - June 1, 2007)
S. Himathongkham, M.L. Dodd, J.K Yee, D.K. Lau, R.G. Bryant, A.S. Badoiu, H.K. Lau, L.S. Guthertz, L. Crawford-Miksza, M.A. Soliman, (2007) Recirculating Immunomagnetic Separation and Optimal Enrichment Conditions for Enhanced Detection and Recovery of Low Levels of Escherichia coli O157:H7 from Fresh Leafy Produce and Surface Water. Food and Drug Laboratory Branch, California Dept. of Public Health, Richmond, CA & U.S. Food and Drug Administration, San Francisco District Laboratory, Alameda, CA, USA (Journal of Food Protection, 2007, 70, No 12, p2717-2724)
E. Papafragkou, M. Plante, K. Mattison, S. Bidawid, K. Karthikeyan, J.M. Farber, L.A. Jaykus (2008) Rapid and Sensitive Detection of Hepatitis A Virus (HAV) in Representative Food Matrices. Dept. of Food Science, North Carolina State University, Raleigh, NC, USA & Health Canada, Food Directorate, Bureau of Microbial Hazards, Ottawa, Ont., Canada (Journal of Virological Methods, 2008, 147, p177-187)
D.E. Hanes, L. Ewing-Peeples, M.H. Kothary, B.D. Tall (2008) Isolation of Francisella tularensis from Foods Using the Pathatrix Immunomagnetic Capture System. Food and Drug Administration (FDA), Laurel, MD, USA (6th ASM Biodefense & Emerging Diseases Research Meeting, Baltimore, MD, USA, February 24 – 27, 2008)

Biological hazards
Biological techniques and tools